William Villiers, 2nd Viscount Grandison (1614 – 23 September 1643) was an Irish peer and Royalist soldier who was fatally wounded during the First English Civil War in 1643.

Personal details

William Villiers was born in 1614, eldest son of Sir Edward Villiers (1585-1626) and Barbara St. John (ca 1592-1672). His father was the older half-brother of George Villiers, 1st Duke of Buckingham, favourite of both James VI and I and Charles I, a relationship from which he greatly benefitted. Appointed Lord President of Munster, he died in Cork in 1626, leaving enormous debts; his wife was still repaying them in the 1660s.

One of ten children, Villiers' siblings included Anne (1610-1654), John (1616-1659), George (1618-1699), Barbara (1618-1681) and Edward (1620-1689). The Villiers were a powerful and well connected family; William's relatives included John Villiers, 1st Viscount Purbeck, Christopher Villiers, 1st Earl of Anglesey, and Susan Feilding, who was Lady of the Bedchamber to Queen Henrietta Maria.

In 1639, Grandison married Mary Bayning (1623-1672), heiress to a fortune of £180,000; they had one daughter, Barbara Villiers (1640-1709), who was later mistress to Charles II. After his death, Mary married his cousin Christopher Villiers, Second Earl of Anglesey (1625-1661).

Career
Villiers grew up mostly in London, where his father was Master of the Mint, a post which gave him rooms at the Tower of London. On 23 June 1623, when his childless great-uncle Oliver St John (1559–1630) was created Viscount Grandison in the peerage of Ireland, the honour was made subject to a special remainder that it would be inherited by the heirs male of St John's niece Barbara Villiers. This meant when St John died in December 1630, Villiers inherited his title.

In 1638 Charles I knighted Grandison at Windsor, together with the Prince of Wales and Thomas Bruce, 1st Earl of Elgin. During the 1639 and 1640 Bishops' Wars, he was commissioned as Colonel but does not appear to have seen action. When the First English Civil War began in August 1642, Grandison raised a regiment of cavalry, which formed part of the Royalist left wing at Edgehill on 23 October. During the fighting, Sir Edmund Verney was killed and the Royal Standard captured but then recovered by three men led by John Smith, an officer in Grandison's regiment. Smith was knighted on the field, becoming the last knight banneret created in England, and promoted to major by Grandison; he was later killed at Cheriton in 1644.

At the Storming of Bristol on 26 July 1643, Grandison led one of three brigades or "tertia" commanded by Prince Rupert of the Rhine. His unit made a series of attacks on Prior's Hill Fort and a redoubt at Stokes Croft, in the third of which he was wounded in the right leg. together with his cousin Edward St John, a son of his uncle Sir John St John. Grandison was taken to Oxford where he died on 29 September, presumably of a fever related to the injury, since Hyde explicitly states the wound caused his death. 

As Grandison had no son, he was succeeded by a younger brother, John Villiers. After the Restoration, Grandison's only child, Barbara Villiers, became a royal mistress of King Charles II, in 1670 was created Duchess of Cleveland, and became the ancestor of several noble families, including the Dukes of Grafton. Grandison's mother, Barbara Lady Villiers, born about 1592, lived into her eighties and saw the Restoration and the early years of her great-grandchildren.

Lord Grandison's youngest brother, Edward, was the father of Edward Villiers, 1st Earl of Jersey, and the present-day Viscount Grandison is his descendant, William Villiers (born 1976), a film executive.

Lydiard portrait
A portrait of Grandison survived at Lydiard House, his mother's family home in Wiltshire, as of 2006. It is catalogued as by the school of Anthony van Dyck. At the bottom right of the canvas is the name "LD. GRANDISSON". This painting was engraved about 1714 by Pieter van Gunst, who identified it as "William Villiers, Vicount Grandisson, Father to ye Late Duchesse of Cleaveland", with the attribution "A v. Dyk pinx". Theresa Lewis, in her Lives of the Friends and Contemporaries of Lord Chancellor Clarendon (1852), gives an unmistakable description of this portrait and reports that two copies of it then existed, one owned by the Duke of Grafton, a direct descendant of Grandison's, and the other by Earl Fitzwilliam.

Another portrait

A similar but more sumptuous portrait of a young man, also known as Viscount Grandison, said to have belonged to George Villiers, 2nd Duke of Buckingham, was at Stocks Park, Hertfordshire, before being exhibited at the Royal Academy in 1893 as the property of Arthur Kay, Esq. After that it was sold to H. O. Miethke, who quickly sold it to Jacob Herzog of Vienna. Exhibited as "William Villiers, Viscount Grandison", this had a great impact at a Van Dyck Tercentenary Exhibition at Antwerp in 1899, and in 1901 the portrait was bought by William Collins Whitney, who paid $125,000 for it. This was the second-highest price ever attached to a painting at the time, defeated only by Millet's Angelus. Still named as a portrait of Grandison, it went on to create a sensation at the Van Dyck Loan Exhibition at Detroit in 1929, and in 1932, on the death of H. P. Whitney, was inherited by his widow Gertrude Vanderbilt Whitney. In 1948 Cornelius Vanderbilt Whitney gave it to the National Gallery of Art in Washington, D.C.

The art historian Lionel Cust, Director of the National Portrait Gallery, suggested in 1905 that the Whitney portrait was of another man, and might be a likeness of the younger brother of Grandison, John Villiers, who became the third Viscount in 1643. A more powerful identification was made in the 1940s, when an early 18th century drawing of the painting by Louis Boudan was found, marked as Henry de Lorraine, duc de Guise. The National Gallery of Art now attaches that name to it.

Notes

References

Sources

External links
 Henri II de Lorraine c. 1634 at nga.gov (National Gallery of Art)

1614 births
1643 deaths
Viscounts Grandison
17th-century English people
17th-century Anglo-Irish people
William
People killed in the English Civil War
Royalist military personnel of the English Civil War